Wilhelm Ingves (born 10 January 1990) is a Finnish footballer who plays as a striker.

Career

IFK Mariehamn
Ingves scored his first league goal in his first ever league appearance on 4 May 2008 against MyPa. By the end of June 2008, he had already established himself as a first team regular in both his club side and the Finnish U-19 national team.

Ingves was dubbed "Lemlands Ronaldo" by fans of IFK Mariehamn due to his entertaining style of play and scoring ability, Lemland being the municipality he's from.

In August 2008, Ingves was offered a contract by Italian club Ascoli Calcio, which he turned down because he wanted to help his current club secure the contract for the next season's Premier Division.

On 17 November 2008, Ingves joined Heerenveen from the Netherlands for a one-week trial together with Mika Ojala from FC Inter Turku.

Wilhelm Ingves signed a new contract with IFK Mariehamn on 8 September 2009, that will keep him at Wiklöf Holding Arena until the end of the 2010 season.
After the 2010 season, Ingves signed a new one-year deal with the club. Before that, he had a test spell with Pomezia Calcio of Italy.

IS Halmia
Ingves signed for IS Halmia on 8 January 2013.

References

External links
Player profile 
Player profile 
Goals scored by Ingves

1990 births
Living people
People from Lemland
Finnish footballers
IFK Mariehamn players
Swedish-speaking Finns
Association football forwards
IS Halmia players
Sportspeople from Åland